Howard Anderson may refer to:

People
Howard A. Anderson Jr. (1920–2015), American visual effects artist and title designer
Howard C. Anderson Jr., North Dakota politician
Howard P. Anderson (1915–2000), Virginia politician
Howard Anderson (ice hockey), for Trail Smoke Eaters (senior)
Howard A. Anderson, American visual effects artist, see Academy Award for Best Visual Effects

Fictional characters
Howard Anderson, character in Babies for Sale
Howard Anderson, character in Legion (2010 film)